Monstar is a 2013 South Korean television series starring Yong Jun-hyung, Ha Yeon-soo, and Kang Ha-neul. It aired on music channel Mnet (and simultaneously on tvN) from May 17 to August 2, 2013, every Friday at 21:50 for 12 episodes. The drama is about how a group of teenagers are healed through the power of music.

Plot 
Seol-chan, a member of Korea's most popular K-pop boy band Men in Black, is provoked into pushing one of his crazy fans, and when that goes viral, his reputation plummets. As damage control, his agency tells him to quietly attend school for a while. Meanwhile, Se-yi, a new transfer student from New Zealand, draws attention in the school for both her talent and oddness. Misunderstandings occur between Seol-chan, Se-yi, and their other classmates. But in the midst of all the chaos, these students find a common interest which connects them to each other: music. Every character has his or her own untold stories, which have had significant impact in their lives. But as they gather together to sing and play the music they love, they learn to soothe the pain inside them, and to open each of their souls.

Cast

Main cast 
 Yong Jun-hyung as Yoon Seol-chan
 Park Ji-woo as young Seol-chan 
 Ha Yeon-soo as Min Se-yi
 Kim Cho-eun as young Se-yi
 Kang Ha-neul as Jung Sun-woo
 Yoon Chan-young as young Sun-woo
 Ahn Nae-sang as Han Ji-woong
 Jung Joon-young as young Han Ji-woong

Color Bar members 
 Dahee as Kim Na-na
 Kim Min-young as Shim Eun-ha
 Ivy as adult Eun-ha 
 Park Kyu-sun as Cha Do-nam
 Kang Eui-sik as Park Kyu-dong
 Lee Eun-sung as young Kyu-dong

All For One members 
 Moon Yong-suk as Ma Joon-hee
 Kim Yoo-hyun as Ma Hyo-rin
 Yoon Jong-hoon as Shin Jae-rok

Supporting cast 
 Kim Sun-kyung as Choi Kyung
 Kim Ye-rim as young Choi Kyung
 Lee Hee-jin as Dokgo Soon
 Kim San-ho as Choi Joon-goo
 Jo Jae-yoon as Manager Hong
 Kim Hee-won as CEO Go
 Kim Jae-heung as math teacher
 Kim Young-hee as language teacher
 Lee Dal-hyung as head teacher
 Nat Thewphaingam as Nawin Thammarat
 Kim Min-young as Shim Eun-ha	
 Kim Young-ho as Min Gwang-ho 
 Im Hyun-sik as Men In Black member (ep 2,6,9,12)
 Lee Min-hyuk as Men In Black member (ep 2,6,9,12)
 Yook Sung-jae as Arnold, Men In Black member (ep 2,6,9,12)
 Lee Chang-sub as Men In Black member (ep 2,6,9,12)

Cameo appearances 
 Ryu Hye-rin as Seol-chan's fan
 Lee Joo-yeon as Ah-ri, actress in opening scene with Seol-chan (ep 1)
 Lee Sung-min as Kwon Tae-hyun, movie director (ep 1)
 Ko Chang-seok as Do-nam's judo master (ep 5)
 Park Ga-ram as waiter (ep 6)
 Kim Ji-soo as performer (ep 10)
 Jo Moon-geun as performer (ep 10)
 Nam Ji-hyun as Stella (ep 12)
 No Min-woo as Daniel Park (ep 12)
 Kim Min-kyu

Original soundtrack

Interlude music

Awards and nominations

Ratings
In this table,  represent the lowest ratings and  represent the highest ratings.

International broadcast
  Japan - It aired on DATV beginning April 30, 2014, followed by reruns on KNTV on May 17 to August 2, 2014.
  Hong Kong: NOW 101 and Channel M
  Singapore: Channel U
  Malaysia: 8TV
  Taiwan: Channel M
  Philippines: Channel M
  Indonesia: RTV
 Thailand: Workpoint TV

Notes

References

External links 
  
 
 

2013 South Korean television series debuts
Mnet television dramas
Korean-language television shows
2010s teen drama television series
TVN (South Korean TV channel) television dramas
South Korean teen dramas
South Korean musical television series
South Korean romance television series
Television series about teenagers